Adam Butcher  (born October 20, 1988) is a Canadian actor.

Early life 
Born in Cambridge, Ontario, Butcher has an older sister, actress Mandy Butcher. Butcher started acting at the age of nine when his aunt (a talent agent) and uncle (a stuntman/coordinator) suggested that Butcher and his sister Mandy get their headshots taken.

Career 
Butcher starred as a teenage long-distance runner in the drama film Saint Ralph (2004). His most current roles were guest appearances on the Disney Original show Life with Derek in the episode "Show-Off-Tune", originally aired August 11, 2007, the episode "Allergy Season", originally aired June 16, 2008, and the episode "Just Friends," appearing as the character of Noel.

In 2009, he appeared in Flashpoint in the episode "The Farm". He portrayed the main character in the 2010 film Dog Pound.

Butcher has also appeared in an episode of Falling Skies, a 2011 alien invasion TV series produced by Steven Spielberg and in three Republic of Doyle episodes as a boy named Dylan. In 2012 he played Darcy in the movie adaptation of The Lesser Blessed. 

He had a small role in season 1 episode 1 of Bomb Girls (2012-2013) as pvt Lewis Pine who briefly courts Gladys Witham (and asks her to marry him) before shipping out overseas.  His letters to Gladys show up in later episodes that causes grief between her and her "actual" fiancé James.

In 2014, he appeared in the Rookie Blue Season 5 Episode 1 "Blink" as well as the web series Long Story, Short opposite Katie Boland.

He starred as Officer Jesse Calvert in the Canadian television show Played in 2013 and also appeared in the 2014 movie Debug, which was written and directed by British-born Canadian actor David Hewlett.

Filmography 
Saint Ralph - 2004
Dog Pound - 2010
The Lesser Blessed - 2012
ARQ - 2016
We're All in This Together - 2021

Awards and nominations 
He was nominated for a Genie Award for Best Actor at the 25th Genie Awards in 2006 for Saint Ralph.

References

External links

1988 births
Canadian male child actors
Canadian male film actors
Canadian male television actors
Living people
People from Cambridge, Ontario
Male actors from Ontario